A small but damaging outbreak of 11 tornadoes impacted the Southeastern United States on the last two days of March 1962. The outbreak was highlighted by a catastrophic, mid-morning F3 tornado that destroyed multiple neighborhoods in Milton, Florida, killing 17 people and injuring 100 others. It was the deadliest tornado ever recorded in Florida until 1998. Overall, the outbreak killed 17 people, injured 105 others, and caused $3.38 million in damage. Lightning caused another two deaths and three injuries.

Background
Multiple rounds of severe thunderstorms struck the Southeast during the final two days of March, bringing heavy rain, flash flooding, frequent lightning, high winds, hail, and tornadoes to the region. Individual storms moved through portions of the region before a large line of storms pushed through.

Increasing southerly winds brought moist, unstable air from the Gulf of Mexico northward into the region. Despite overcast skies being over the area since early on March 30 and scattered storms passing over the region just after midnight on March 31, the moist and unstable environment remained in place until much stronger storms entered the area later that morning. Even with the volatile atmospheric conditions, weather forecasters only called for scattered showers for the area on March 31.

Confirmed tornadoes

March 30 event

March 31 event

Milton, Florida

In the far northeastern suburbs of Pensacola, Florida, a tornado developed south of Hamilton Bridge Road west of Milton, shortly after 9 am CST on March 31. It then grew into a large, destructive tornado as it moved northeastward through the northwest side of town. It struck multiple neighborhoods with little to no warning, heavily damaging or destroying dozens of frame homes. The hardest-hit area was the College Park residential area, where several homes were completely leveled with some swept away while other homes were extensively damaged. In an extreme case, one home was swept off its foundation while the neighboring home was lifted off its foundation and set back down on the empty slab of the swept away home. At the corner of Magnolia and Orange St, a man's car stalled right in the path of the tornado. He and his car was carried two blocks to Stewart St, where it landed essentially intact. A  microwave tower was blown over and a number of high-voltage power lines were knocked down. Trailers and cars were also thrown several hundred feet. After exiting Milton, the tornado continued northeastward, uprooting trees and damaging other isolated structures before dissipating on Munson Highway north of its intersection with Wolfe Road just southwest of Roeville. When the Fujita Scale was made operational in the 1970s, the damage from the tornado was rated F2-F3, giving the tornado a final maximum rating F3. In all, a total of 130 homes, including 75 small homes, were destroyed along a six-block area. About 200 other homes and buildings were damaged. Extensive damage also occurred at a mobile home park. There were 17 deaths, including five out of six members of one family, as well as a mother and three young children that were killed in their home. At least 10 homes had a single death. An additional 100 people were injured, about 80 of which required treatment. This made it the deadliest tornado ever recorded in Florida until 1998 as well the worst tornado ever recorded in Santa Rosa County. The storm that produced the tornado may have also caused a lightning-induced injury in Crestview, Florida, two hours later.

Non-tornadic impacts
There were 13 reports of high winds and large hail during the events. Both events occurred on March 31.

Early on March 30, a lightning strike sparked a large fire at a horse stable in Kingston, Oklahoma, although no casualties occurred. That evening, two students were struck by lightning while walking on the Emory University campus, killing one and injuring the other. Early the next morning, a woman was knocked unconscious and injured in Decatur, Tennessee, after lightning traveled from outside her farmhouse into her kitchen through the water pipes, sparking a fire. Later, another man was killed in Lee County, Alabama, when the power line he was working on was struck by lightning. One other person was injured by lightning in Crestview, Florida.

Rounds of storms caused widespread hail and wind damage in Central Alabama on March 30. Albertville was buried under  of marble-sized hail. The small hail caused an unusually high amount of destruction as it damaged roofs, broke windows, and heavily damaged a greenhouse, trees, and shrubs. Early the next morning, a line of storms caused heavy wind damage in Port Arthur, Texas.

Aftermath and records
The Florida Highway Patrol, who were some of the first on the scene in Milton, Florida after the F3 tornado, provided early estimates of 75 homes being destroyed, with varying degrees of damage to many others. They also estimated that 75 to 100 people had been injured. At the time of the tornado, the town of Milton had only about 4,000 residents (as of 2020 it has an estimated population of over 10,000 residents) and one 50-bed hospitalSanta Rosa Hospital, which was quickly overwhelmed after the storm. A total 52 people were treated and released from Santa Rosa Hospital. Some of the most seriously injured victims were eventually sent to Escambia General Baptist Hospital and Sacred Heart N.A.S. Pensacola in Pensacola, Florida. Meanwhile, a temporary makeshift morgue was made in the core of Milton as highway patrolmen, civil defense workers, and volunteers sifted through collapsed buildings in search of survivors and bodies. Many telephone lines were damaged and the few that were remaining were completely overwhelmed by long-distance calls.

The 17 deaths caused by the F3 tornado made it the deadliest tornado of 1962 as well as the deadliest tornado ever recorded in Florida until 1998, when another F3 (initially rated F4) tornado killed 25.

See also

 List of North American tornadoes and tornado outbreaks
 Tornado outbreak of February 23–24, 2016

Notes

References

External links
 Milton Tornado 1962

Tornadoes of 1962
F3 tornadoes
Tornadoes in Alabama
Tornadoes in Louisiana
Tornadoes in Florida
Tornadoes in Georgia (U.S. state)
Tornadoes in Mississippi